Latin American cinema refers collectively to the film output and film industries of Latin America.  Latin American film is both rich and diverse, but the main centers of production have been Argentina, Brazil and Mexico. Latin American cinema flourished after the introduction of sound, which added a linguistic barrier to the export of Hollywood film south of the border.

History
The origins of early filmmaking is generally associated with Salvador Toscano Barragán. In 1898 Toscano made Mexico's second film with a plot, titled Don Juan Tenorio. During the Mexican Revolution, Toscano recorded several clips of the battles, which would become a full-length documentary in 1950, assembled by his daughter. Other short films were either created or influenced from French film-makers.
Mexican movies from the Golden Era in the 1940s and 1950s are significant examples of Latin American cinema. Mexican movies were exported and exhibited in all Latin America and Europe. The film Maria Candelaria (1944) by Emilio Fernández, won the Grand Prix in Cannes Film Festival in 1946. Famous actors and actresses from this period include María Félix, Pedro Infante, Dolores del Río, Jorge Negrete and comedian Cantinflas.

The 1950s and 1960s saw a movement towards Third Cinema, led by the Argentine filmmakers Fernando Solanas and Octavio Getino.

In Brazil, the Cinema Novo movement created a particular way of making movies with critical and intellectual screenplays, a clearer photography related to the light of the outdoors in a tropical landscape, and a political message. The film The Given Word / Keeper of Promises (1962) by Anselmo Duarte, won the Palme d'Or at the 1962 Cannes Film Festival, becoming the first (and to date the only) Brazilian film to achieve that feat. A year later, it also became the first Brazilian and South American film nominated for the Academy Award for Best Foreign Language Film. Director Glauber Rocha was the key figure of the Brazilian Cinema Novo movement, famous for his trilogy of political films: Deus e o Diabo na Terra do Sol, Terra em Transe (1967) and O Dragão da Maldade Contra o Santo Guerreiro (1969), for which he won the Best Director award at the Cannes Film Festival.

In Colombia, Carlos Mayolo, Luis Ospina and Andrés Caicedo led an alternative movement that was to have lasting influence, founding the Grupo de Cali, which they called Caliwood and producing some films as leading exponents of the "New Latin American Cinema" of the 1960s and 1970s, including Oiga, Vea, Agarrando pueblo. Pura sangre (Ospina) and Carne de tu carne (Mayolo) were produced in the 1980s and belong to a different aesthetics.
  
Cuban cinema has enjoyed much official support since the Cuban revolution, and important film-makers include Tomás Gutiérrez Alea.

In Argentina, after a series of military governments that shackled culture in general, the industry re-emerged after the 1976–1983 military dictatorship to produce The Official Story in 1985, becoming the first of only three Latin American movies to win the Academy Award for Best Foreign Language Film. Other nominees for Argentina were The Truce (1974), Pixote(1981)(directed by Hector Babenco), Camila (1984), Hombre mirando al sudeste(Man Facing Southeast directed by Eliseo Subiela)(1986), Tango (1998), Son of the Bride (2001), The Secret In Their Eyes (2009, which also won the award) and Wild Tales (2014).

More recently, a new style of directing and stories filmed has been tagged as "New Latin American Cinema," although this label was also used in the 1960s and 1970s.

In Mexico movies such as Como agua para chocolate (1992), Cronos (1993), Amores perros (2000), Y tu mamá también (2001), Pan's Labyrinth (2006) and Babel (2006) have been successful in creating universal stories about contemporary subjects, and were internationally recognised, as in the prestigious Cannes Film Festival. Mexican directors Alejandro González Iñárritu, Alfonso Cuarón (Harry Potter and the Prisoner of Azkaban), Guillermo del Toro and screenwriter Guillermo Arriaga have gone on to Hollywood success, with Cuaron and González Iñárritu becoming the only Latin Americans to  win both the Academy Award and the Directors Guild of America award for Best Director.

The Argentine economic crisis affected the production of films in the late 1990s and early 2000s, but many Argentine movies produced during those years were internationally acclaimed, including El abrazo partido (2004), Roma (2004) and Nueve reinas (2000), which was the basis for the 2004 American remake Criminal.

The modern Brazilian film industry has become more profitable inside the country, and some of its productions have received prizes and recognition in Europe and the United States. The comedy film O Auto da Compadecida (2000) is considered a classic of Brazilian cinema and was a box-office hit in the country. Movies like Central Station (1998), City of God (2002) and Elite Squad (2007) have fans around the world, and its directors Walter Salles, Fernando Meirelles and José Padilha, have taken part in American and European film projects. Central Station was nominated for 2 Academy Awards in 1999: Best Foreign Language Film and Best Actress for Fernanda Montenegro, who became the first (and to date the only) Brazilian, the first (and to date the only) Portuguese-speaking and the first Latin-American to be nominated for Best Actress. In 2003, City of God was nominated for 4 Academy Awards: Best Director, Best Adapted Screenplay, Best Cinematography and Best Film Editing, it was also nominated for a Golden Globe Award for Best Foreign Language Film. 
Elite Squad won the Golden Bear at the 2008 Berlin Film Festival.

There is a movement in the US geared towards promoting and exposing audiences to Latin American filmmakers. The New England Festival of Ibero American Cinema - which takes place in Providence, Rhode Island, is a good example.

According to PWC's Global Media Outlook 2019-2023 report, production levels for major film industries in Latin America is seeing an upward trend ever since 2014. By the end of 2018 there were 13,464 screens in Latin America. In case of Argentina there were 223 films released in 2018. In Peru, despite being one of the smallest Latin American markets has increased their screens to 661 in 2018 and would amount to 789 by 2023. Mexico continues to have the highest amount of screens with a total of 6,862 while Brazil next with 3,465  screens. In terms of revenues, the study projects steady growth in the region towards 2023. The box office is expected to rise from $2.4 billion raised in 2018 to $3.2 billion by 2023. This would represent a compound annual growth rate of 5.7 per cent for that period.

In Latin America in general, there has been renewed interest in animation ever since the late 2010s Ventana Sur's Animation! and Mexico's Pixelatl festivals have inaugurated the creative potential of animators to an international level. Two of Latin America's biggest animation companies are Mexico’ Ánima Estudios and Brazil's TV Pinguim. Together with the other animation houses in Latin America, they are bringing forth stories depicting the exotic locations of South America, the indigenous myths and legends, and universal themes that has the potential to have worldwide appeal. In 2017 alone more than 100 feature-length animated films were currently worked on in Central and South America. Financial backing is the only factor that holds back the Latin American animation industry such as those in Peru.

See also

 Cinema of Argentina
 Cinema of Bolivia
 Cinema of Brazil
 Cinema of Chile
 Cinema of Colombia
 Cinema of Cuba
 Cinema of Haiti
 Cinema of Mexico
 Cinema of Paraguay
 Cinema of Peru
 Cinema of Puerto Rico
 Cinema of Uruguay
 Cinema of Venezuela
 List of Latin American films
 List of Guatemalan films
 List of Honduran films
 List of Nicaraguan films
 List of Costa Rican films
 List of Panamanian films
 List of Bolivian films
 List of Dominican films
 List of Uruguayan films
 List of Venezuelan films
 Latin American art
 Latin literature
 Latin American culture
 World cinema

References

Further reading
Timothy Barnard and Peter Rist (eds.): South American Cinema: A Critical Filmography 1915-1994, Austin: University of Texas Press, 1996
Julianne Burton (ed.): Cinema and Social Change in Latin America. Conversations with Filmmakers, Austin: University of Texas Press, 1986
Julianne Burton (ed.): The Social Documentary in Latin America, Pittsburgh: University of Pittsburgh Press, 1990
Alberto Elena, Marina Diaz Lopez (eds.): The Cinema of Latin America (24 Frames), Columbia Univ Press, 2003, 
Miriam Haddu, Joanna Page (eds.): Visual Synergies in Fiction and Documentary Film from Latin America, Palgrave Macmillan, 2009
Stephen M. Hart. A Companion to Latin American Film, Tamesis, 2004
John King: Magical Reels: A History of Cinema in Latin America, New edition, Verso, 2000, 
Michael T. Martin (ed.): New Latin American Cinema, Volume 1: Theories, Practices, and Transcontinental Articulations, Wayne State University Press, 1997
Michael T. Martin (ed.): New Latin American Cinema, Volume 2: Studies of National Cinemas, Wayne State University Press, 1997
Isabel Maurer Queipo (ed.): Directory of World Cinema: Latin America, intellectbooks, 2013, 
Zuzana M. Pick. The New Latin American Cinema: A Continental Project, University of Texas Press, 1993
Paul A. Schroeder Rodriguez. Latin American Cinema: A Comparative History, University of California Press, 2016
Ronald Schwartz. Latin American Films, 1932-1994: A Critical Filmography, McFarland, 1997
Deborah Shaw (ed.): Contemporary Latin American Cinema: Breaking Into the Global Market, Rowman & Littlefield, 2007, 
Donald F. Stevens (ed.): Based on a True Story: Latin American History at the Movies, Scholarly Resources, 1997, 
Ann Marie Stock (ed.): Framing Latin American Cinema: Contemporary Critical Perspectives, University of Minnesota Press, 1997

External links
 New England Festival of Ibero American Cinema
 Top 100 Ibero-American movies of all time
 Latin American Cinema, Centro Virtual Cervantes
 Latineos - Latin America, Caribbean, arts and culture
 
 Brazilian Director Walter Salles talks about his career
 Guide to Spanish Language Movies

 
Cinema by location
Latin American
Latin American
Cinema